Markaz Shabab Balata is a professional football team based in the Balata refugee camp in Nablus, Palestine, that plays in the West Bank Premier League. Founded in 1954, it won promotion to the WBPL in 2010.

Current squad

Honours
Palestine Cup
Runners-up (1): 2011

Asian record
AFC Cup: 1 appearance
2021: Group stage

Continental results

References

External links
League at fifa.com

Football clubs in the West Bank
Association football clubs established in 1954
1954 establishments in the West Bank Governorate